Verónica Cepede Royg and María Irigoyen were the defending champions, but Cepede Royg chose not to compete and Irigoyen chose to compete in Victoria instead.

Wildcards Julia Boserup and Nicole Gibbs won the title, defeating the top seeds Paula Cristina Gonçalves and Sanaz Marand in the final, 6–3, 6–4.

Seeds

Draw

References 
 Draw

Red Rock Pro Open - Doubles
2015 Red Rock Pro Open